László Szőgyény-Marich is the name of:

 László Szőgyény-Marich, Sr., Hungarian Court Chancellor, Speaker of the House of Magnates
 László Szőgyény-Marich, Jr., Hungarian diplomat, ambassador, Minister besides the King